Argiope submaronica is a species of spider in the family Araneidae (orb-weavers), found from Mexico to Bolivia, and in Brazil. The name was at one time considered a synonym of Argiope argentata, but A. submaronica is now treated as a separate species. It has also been known under the synonym Argiope savignyi.

It was observed to capture and feed on the proboscis bat Rhynchonycteris naso in Costa Rica, totally encasing the bat in silk during the course of a day.

Through an observational study done at the La Selva Biological Station, they saw that the bats are usually caught on the spider’s web and then fully wrapped by the spider’s silk. Afterward, the spider was observed to be near or on the bat as the day went by and manipulation of its parts of the mouth on the bat signified active feeding. This was the first recorded phenomenon of an emballonurid bat being preyed on by an invertebrate, and the first documented proof of Argiope being able to catch and consume a mammal.

A. savignyi sometimes spins a silk disc, sometimes a cruciate pattern, and sometimes combines both types.
These structures are thought to provide five purposes: protection from predators, advertising to vertebrates to avoid web damage, prey attraction, web stability, and a source of shade. Different designs had different purposes or functions.

References

Herberstein, M. E.; Craig, C. L.; Coddington, J. A. & Elgar, M. A. (2000): The functional significance of silk decorations of orb-web spiders: a critical review of the empirical evidence. Biological Reviews 75: 649-669. Abstract
Timm, Robert M. & Losilla, Mauricio (2007): Orb-weaving Spider, Argiope savignyi (Araneidae), Predation on the Proboscis Bat Rhynchonycteris naso (Emballonuridae). Caribbean Journal of Science 43(2): 282-284. PDF

Further reading
Levi, Herbert W. (1968): The spider genera Gea and Argiope in America (Araneae: Araneidae). Bull. Mus. comp. Zool. Harv. 136: 319-352.
Robinson, Michael H. & Robinson, Barbara (1977): Associations Between Flies and Spiders: Bibiocommensalism and Dipsoparasitism? Psyche 84: 150-157. PDF
Nentwig, Wolfgang (1985): Prey analysis of four species of tropical orb-weaving spiders (Araneae: Araneidae) and a comparison with araneids of the temperate zone. Oecologia 66(4): 580-594. 
Rovner, Jerome S. (1989): Submersion survival in aerial web-weaving spiders from a tropical wet forest. Journal of Arachnology 17: 242-245. PDF

submaronica
Spiders of Mexico
Spiders of Central America
Spiders of South America
Spiders described in 1916